The 2017 NextEra Energy Resources 250 was a NASCAR Camping World Truck Series race held at Daytona International Speedway in Daytona Beach, Florida on February 24, 2017. The race was the first of the 2017 NASCAR Camping World Truck Series.

Entry list

Qualifying results

Race summary

Race results

See also

 2017 Daytona 500

References

NextEra Energy Resources 250
NASCAR races at Daytona International Speedway
2017 NASCAR Camping World Truck Series
February 2017 sports events in the United States